Adelina Dmitriyevna Sotnikova (born 1 July 1996) is a retired Russian figure skater. She is the 2014 Olympic gold medalist in ladies' singles, a two-time European silver medalist (2012, 2013), a two-time Rostelecom Cup bronze medalist (2011, 2015), and a four-time Russian national champion (2009, 2011, 2012, 2014).

On the junior level, she is the 2012 Youth Olympic silver medalist, the 2011 Junior World champion, the 2010 Junior Grand Prix Final champion, and the 2009 Russian junior national champion.

Sotnikova stopped competing after the 2015–2016 season. She announced her retirement on 1 March 2020.

Career

Early years 
Adelina Sotnikova began skating at the age of four at the Yuzhny ice rink near her home in Moscow. Taught by Anna Patrikeeva until the age of seven, she then began training at CSKA which is further away from her home. She began working with coach Elena Buianova (Vodorezova) a year later.

During the 2008–2009 season, Sotnikova debuted at the senior level at the 2009 Russian Nationals and won the gold medal at the age of 12. One month later she also won the 2009 Russian Junior Championships.

Sotnikova was ineligible to compete on the Junior Grand Prix circuit during the 2009–2010 season because International Skating Union rules require that skaters turn 13 before 1 July in their place of birth – she was born a few hours into 1 July in Moscow. Sotnikova's mother told her that she was born a month prematurely anyway. She struggled with a growth spurt and dropped to fourth at Russian senior nationals and sixth in the junior event.

2010–2011 season
Sotnikova made her Junior Grand Prix debut during the 2010–2011 season. She won gold medals in Austria and the U.K. and qualified for the 2010 Junior Grand Prix Final where she won the title.
At the 2011 Russian Championships, she placed second in the short program and first in the long, to win her second national title. She was assigned to the World Junior Championships where she won the gold medal ahead of teammate Elizaveta Tuktamysheva.

2011–2012 season
According to ISU age rules, Sotnikova was eligible for the senior Grand Prix circuit during the 2011–2012 season, although not for senior ISU Championships. She was assigned to two Grand Prix events, the 2011 Cup of China and 2011 Rostelecom Cup. She intended to begin her season at the 2011 Ondrej Nepela Memorial but withdrew after a leg injury caused her to miss a month of off-season training. She won the bronze medal at Cup of China and at Rostelecom Cup, to become the first alternate for the ladies' event at the Grand Prix Final.

Sotnikova then competed at the 2011 Golden Spin of Zagreb and won the gold medal. At the 2012 Russian Championships, she placed first in the short program and second in the long program, to win her third national title. She then competed at the 2012 Youth Olympic Games and won the silver medal. At the 2012 World Junior Championships, she won the bronze medal behind teammate Yulia Lipnitskaya and U.S. skater Gracie Gold. Sotnikova was named to the Russian team for the 2012 ISU World Team Trophy. She finished 4th overall and posted a season's best in her free skate of 113.57 points.

2012–2013 season
Sotnikova started her season with a silver medal at the 2012 Nebelhorn Trophy. Her first GP event of the season was the 2012 Skate America. In the free skate, Sotnikova's 3Lo-2T-2Lo jump combination received no points because it was deemed an invalid element. She won the bronze medal overall behind Americans Christina Gao and Ashley Wagner. At her next event, the 2012 Rostelecom Cup, Sotnikova finished 5th. At the 2013 Russian Championships, she won the bronze medal behind Elena Radionova and Elizaveta Tuktamysheva. At the 2013 European Championships, she placed first in the short program, third in the long program, and won the silver medal overall, 0.72 points behind gold medalist Carolina Kostner. Sotnikova and bronze medalist Elizaveta Tuktamysheva were Russia's first medalists in the Europeans ladies' event since Irina Slutskaya won the title in 2006.

After Europeans, Sotnikova performed in Art on Ice in Switzerland. She finished 9th in her World Championships debut. Appearing in her second team event, she placed fourth in ladies at the 2013 World Team Trophy. Team Russia finished 4th overall.

2013–2014 season
Sotnikova started her season competing with Team Europe at the 2013 Japan Open. Her first 2013–14 Grand Prix assignment was Cup of China. She placed first in the short and third in the free skate, winning the silver medal ahead of Carolina Kostner. In her next event, the 2013 Trophée Éric Bompard, she placed third in the short, first in the free skate, and won the silver medal behind American Ashley Wagner. The results qualified Sotnikova to her first Grand Prix Final. At the event in Fukuoka, Japan, she was second in the short, sixth in the free, and finished 5th overall.

At the 2014 Russian Championships, Sotnikova placed first in the short, second in the free, and won her fourth national title, edging out Yulia Lipnitskaya for the gold. Appearing in her second European Championships, Sotnikova placed first in the short and second in the free, taking the silver medal with an overall score of 202.36 points while Lipnitskaya won gold. She is the second Russian skater to record a score above the 200 mark in ladies' singles.

2014 Olympic Winter Games
The figure skating at the 2014 Sochi Winter Olympics began with the team event. Although Russian skating officials initially intended to assign Sotnikova and Lipnitskaya to one program each, they decided a week before the event that Lipnitskaya would skate both segments.

Sotnikova won the gold medal in the ladies' individual event with an overall score of 224.59 points, becoming one of the youngest Olympic figure skating champions. She was second behind the defending Olympic and reigning World Champion Kim Yuna by 0.28 point after the short program, but overtook Kim by winning the free skate. However, Sotnikova's victory was controversial due to allegations of judges' impartiality and criticisms of the scoring system. Questions over the judges, the judging system, and the anonymity of scores were also raised in the press. In the press conference after her win at the Olympics, Sotnikova stated that she became "more motivated to win the singles competition" after not being chosen to compete in the earlier team competition. 

She was awarded the Order of Friendship by Vladimir Putin on 24 February 2014. Sotnikova did not participate in the 2014 World Championships held in Saitama, Japan.

2014–2015 season
Sotnikova was selected to compete at 2014 Rostelecom Cup and 2014 NHK Trophy, but withdrew due to a torn ankle ligament. She later withdrew from the 2015 Russian Championships. While doctors had forbidden her to jump in full force, Adelina Sotnikova decided to focus on the choreographic component in appearances with Gleb Savchenko  in the 2015 Russian version of Dancing with the Stars.

2015–2016 season 
Sotnikova placed 4th in the individual competition of Japan Open.  She appeared at two Challenger Series events, winning the silver medal at the 2015 Mordovian Ornament behind Anna Pogorilaya and placing 6th at the 2015 Golden Spin of Zagreb. On the ISU Grand Prix, Sotnikova competed only at 2015 Rostelecom Cup, and won bronze medal behind her teammates Elena Radionova and Evgenia Medvedeva.

On 24–27 December 2015, Sotnikova competed at the 2016 Russian Championships and placed 6th. She was named only as an alternate for the 2016 European Championships.

From 2016 to March 2020 
As injuries started to linger, Sotnikova did not participate at any event, domestic and international, from 2016 onwards. In April 2017, she changed coach and training location, by hiring former Olympic men's champion Evgeni Plushenko at his skating academy, Angels of Plushenko in Moscow. But her persisting health problems prevented her from performing at any competition.

While doing a skating show in Turkey during the summer of 2019, Sotnikova experienced back pain, but thought that it was manageable. However, just prior to the 2019 Rostelecom Cup exhibition gala, her spine pain persisted to the point she was considering consulting for further treatment. In December, after facing more serious pain, she was recommended surgery, but decided to delay it due to ongoing commitments, including performances of Plushenko's New Year show as Cinderella. In late February, she underwent surgery, in which she got two spinal implants connected by a metal sheet, itself fixed by six titanium screws inserted into the vertebrae.

On 1 March 2020, Sotnikova officially announced her retirement from competitive figure skating. She plans however, thanks to her surgery, to perform in skating shows in the near future.

Personal life
Sotnikova was born on 1 July 1996 in Moscow. Her father, Dmitry, is a police officer and her mother, Olga, has worked as a homemaker and in merchandising. Her sister, Maria, is two years younger and has Treacher Collins syndrome. Sotnikova credits Maria as the most influential person on her career and sees figure skating as a job to support her sister. Sotnikova attended a high school where athletes form about half the student body. In 2013, she enrolled in a sports university with a view to becoming a coach.

In 2015, Sotnikova started up a beauty salon called "Studio Be Happy" in Moscow, which was rebranded as "Studio Adelina Sotnikova" by mid-July 2019. On October 30, 2022, she gave birth to his first child, a boy she named Adrian.

Political views
On 18 March 2022, Sotnikova attended Vladimir Putin's Moscow rally, which celebrated the annexation of Crimea by the Russian Federation from Ukraine and justified the Russian invasion of the country. On Instagram, she posted a video of herself singing along with Nikolay Rastorguyev, as well as other videos from the rally.

In August 2022, Sotnikova visited Russian-occupied Donbass in a publicity tour. In December 2022, the Ukrainian Parliament sanctioned Sotnikova for her support of the war.

In March 2023, she commented on the International Olympic Committee's proposal to allow Russian athletes to participate in the 2024 Summer Olympics as neutrals:

Programs

Competitive highlights

 GP: Grand Prix; CS: Challenger Series; JGP: Junior Grand Prix

Detailed results
Small medals for short program and free skating awarded only at ISU Championships – Worlds, Europeans, and Junior Worlds. At team events, medals awarded for team results only.

Senior level

Junior level

References

External links

 
 

1996 births
Living people
Russian female single skaters
Figure skaters from Moscow
World Junior Figure Skating Championships medalists
European Figure Skating Championships medalists
Figure skaters at the 2014 Winter Olympics
Olympic figure skaters of Russia
Olympic gold medalists for Russia
Olympic medalists in figure skating
Medalists at the 2014 Winter Olympics
Figure skaters at the 2012 Winter Youth Olympics
20th-century Russian women
21st-century Russian women
Sports controversies